Men's 71 kg competition in Judo at the 1980 Summer Olympics in Moscow, Soviet Union was held at Palace of Sports of the Central Lenin Stadium. The gold medal won by Ezio Gamba from Italy.

Results

Pool A

Pool B

Repechages

Final

References

External links
  Official reports of the 1980 Summer Olympics

Judo at the 1980 Summer Olympics
Judo at the Summer Olympics Men's Lightweight